South Darley is a civil parish in the Derbyshire Dales. It is a largely rural parish and covers the villages of Darley Bridge, Wensley and the hamlets of Oker and Snitterton. South Darley lies west of Matlock and east of Winster. The River Derwent forms the north-eastern boundary of South Darley parish with Darley Dale parish on the other bank. About two thirds of the parish lies within the Peak District.

South Darley Village Hall is located in the Cross Green area of Darley Bridge and was opened in 1932. It stands next to South Darley Church of England Primary School and opposite Cross Green Plantation.

The parish contains a Grade-II listed church, St Mary the Virgin.

History 
South Darley was an urban district from 1894 until it was abolished and merged to form Matlock Urban District in 1934.

See also
Listed buildings in South Darley

References

External links
South Darley Parish Council
South Darley CE Primary School
Peak Rail

Further reading 
Taylor, Keith and  Brown, Trevor (2000) A Derbyshire Parish at War: South Darley and the Great War 1914-1918 (p244). Derbyshire: Country Books. ISBN 1-898941-53-X 
Taylor , Keith and Brown, Trevor (2001) A Derbyshire Parish at Peace and War: South Darley 1925-1955 (p304). Derbyshire: Country Books. ISBN 1-898941-59-9
Taylor, Keith (2002) Darley Dale Remembered: through 50 years of war and peace (448p). Derbyshire: Country Books. ISBN 1-898941-79-3

Civil parishes in Derbyshire
Derbyshire Dales